A. Vasanth Kumar is an Indian cinematographer from Chennai, Tamil Nadu, India. He graduated from the M.G.R. Government Film and Television Training Institute, commonly known as Adyar Film Institute, in Chennai.

Filmography

Awards and honors

 Best Student Cinematographer Award - Diploma Short Film "Nagaram" 2003 from Eastman Kodak; India
 Best Cinematographer Award - Hindi feature film "Kaafiron Ki Namaaz" at Dada Saheb Phalke Film Festival, 2014
 Best Cinematographer Award - Short Film "Awakenings" at Mcminnville International Short Film Festival; USA
 Best Cinematographer Award - Short Film "Awakenings" at Independent Horror Movie Awards; USA
 Best Cinematographer Award - Short Film "Awakenings" at Los Angeles International Independent Film Awards, USA (LAIFFA)
 Best Cinematographer Award - Short Film "The Black Cat" at Critics Choice Short Film Awards (CCSFA) INDIA 2018

References

 http://www.thehindu.com/features/cinema/kaafiron-ki-namaaz-wins-best-film-award-at-ladakh-film-fest/article6164060.ece
 http://www.freepressjournal.in/entertainment/movie-reviews/movie-review-kaafiron-ki-namaaz-drama-tricks-without-validity/821643
 
 http://indiaindependentfilms.com/2016/04/08/film-review-kaafiron-ki-namaaz/
 http://www.oneknightstands.net/kaafiron-ki-namaaz-2013-movie-review/
 
 http://www.greatandhra.com/movies/reviews/nee-jataga-nenundaali-review-no-match-to-the-original-59184.html
 http://www.123telugu.com/reviews/nee-jathaga-nenundali-telugu-movie-review.html
 http://www.apherald.com/Movies/Reviews/62857/Nee-Jathaga-Nenundali-Telugu-Movie-Review-Rating/
 http://survi.in/2014/08/jaya-ravindras-nee-jathaga-nenundali-2014-movie-review.html
 http://timesofindia.indiatimes.com/entertainment/tamil/movie-reviews/indru-netru-naalai/movie-review/47830888.cms
 http://www.rediff.com/movies/report/review-indru-netru-naalai-is-a-total-entertainer/20150626.htm
 Sify.com
 
 http://www.vikatan.com/cinema/movie-review/48611.html
 http://www.ibtimes.co.in/indru-netru-naalai-movie-review-entertaining-sci-fi-flick-starring-vishnu-vishal-mia-george-637233
 
 http://www.telugucinema.com/reviews/Savitri-Movie-Review
 http://www.gulte.com/moviereviews/539/Savitri-Movie-Review
 http://www.ibtimes.co.in/savitri-movie-review-by-audience-live-update-672948

External links 
 

1983 births
Living people
Hindi film cinematographers
Artists from Chennai
Cinematographers from Tamil Nadu